August German von Bohn (25 February 1812, in Heilbronn – 23 January 1899, in Stuttgart) was a German painter.

Biography 
German von Bohn first studied in law in Tübingen before he studied painting. He was the student of Henri Lehmann and Ary Scheffer in Paris. He stayed in Rome from 1840 to 1843, then he came back to Paris and was made a Knight of the Legion of Honour in 1853.

In 1857, he settled in Stuttgart and became a court painter. He also made wall paintings in churches in France.

His works are held in several museums in Germany, France and Italy.

Works in public collections 
La Mort de Cléopâtre, 1842, oil on canvas, Fine Arts Museum, Nantes

References

Bibliography

External links

 Works by German von Bohn, photography agency of the RMN

19th-century German painters
19th-century German male artists
German portrait painters
Court painters
People from Heilbronn
1812 births
1899 deaths